David Allen "D.J." Johnson (born July 14, 1966) is a former cornerback who played eight seasons in the National Football League (NFL), mainly for the Pittsburgh Steelers. He entered broadcasting after his retirement as a player.

Career
After attending the University of Kentucky, Johnson played for the Pittsburgh Steelers (1989-1993), Atlanta Falcons (1994-1996) and Arizona Cardinals (1996). He finished his career with 19 interceptions in 117 games.

After retiring, he worked as a sideline reporter with Pat Summerall and John Madden as the lead crew. He worked the NFC Championship Games in 1999 and 2000.  He became a broadcaster for The NFL on FOX in 2001 with Scott Graham.

He is also an actor, appearing as a Klingon in the Star Trek: Enterprise episode "Judgement".

References

1966 births
Living people
American football cornerbacks
Kentucky Wildcats football players
Pittsburgh Steelers players
Atlanta Falcons players
Arizona Cardinals players
National Football League announcers
Players of American football from Louisville, Kentucky
Louisville Male High School alumni